Rita Corrigan was a pitcher who played in the All-American Girls Professional Baseball League. She was born in Cleveland, Ohio.

Corrigan was assigned to the Racine Belles during its 1943 season. She did not have individual records or some information was incomplete.

The AAGPBL folded in 1954, but there is a permanent display at the Baseball Hall of Fame and Museum at Cooperstown, New York since November 5, 1988, that honors the entire league rather than any individual figure.

Sources

All-American Girls Professional Baseball League players
Racine Belles (1943–1950) players
Baseball players from Cleveland
Date of birth missing
Possibly living people
Year of birth missing